Bulloo was a Legislative Assembly electorate in the state of Queensland.

History
Bulloo was created in 1888. It was located in far south-west Queensland. It was abolished in the 1910 redistribution (taking effect at the 1912 elections), being incorporated into the Electoral district of Warrego.

Members

The following people were elected in the seat of Bulloo:

See also
 Electoral districts of Queensland
 Members of the Queensland Legislative Assembly by year
 :Category:Members of the Queensland Legislative Assembly by name

References

Former electoral districts of Queensland
1888 establishments in Australia
1912 disestablishments in Australia
Constituencies established in 1888
Constituencies disestablished in 1912